This is a complete list of candidates nominated to run for the 2011 election of the Northern Ireland Assembly.  14 parties fielded a total of 218 candidates across Northern Ireland's 18, six-member constituencies.  Of the 218 candidates fielded, 38 were women.

References

External links 
 

Northern Ireland Assembly